Invariance of domain is a theorem in topology about homeomorphic subsets of Euclidean space . 
It states: 

The theorem and its proof are due to L. E. J. Brouwer, published in 1912. 
The proof uses tools of algebraic topology, notably the Brouwer fixed point theorem.

Notes

The conclusion of the theorem can equivalently be formulated as: " is an open map".

Normally, to check that  is a homeomorphism, one would have to verify that both  and its inverse function  are continuous; 
Both of these statements are not at all obvious and are not generally true if one leaves Euclidean space.

Consider for instance the map  defined by  
A more extreme example is the map  defined by  because here  is injective and continuous but does not even yield a homeomorphism onto its image.

The theorem is also not generally true in infinitely many dimensions. Consider for instance the Banach Lp space  of all bounded real sequences. 
Define  as the shift   

Consequences

An important consequence of the domain invariance theorem is that  cannot be homeomorphic to  if  

Generalizations

There are also generalizations to certain types of continuous maps from a Banach space to itself.

See also

  for other conditions that ensure that a given continuous map is open.

Notes

References

 
 
 
 
 
  (see p. 72–73 for Hirsch's proof utilizing non-existence of a differentiable retraction)

External links

 

Algebraic topology
Theory of continuous functions
Homeomorphisms
Theorems in topology